Amphritea japonica is a Gram-negative, rod-shaped, non-spore-forming and motile bacterium from the genus of Amphritea which has been isolated from sediments near a sperm whale carcasses from Kagoshima on Japan.

References

External links
Type strain of Amphritea japonica at BacDive -  the Bacterial Diversity Metadatabase

Oceanospirillales
Bacteria described in 2008